The Story of The Farmer's Three Daughters (Icelandic: Bóndadæturnar; English: "The Farmer's Daughters") is an Icelandic fairy tale collected by author Jón Árnason in his 1864 compilation of Icelandic tales and legends (Íslenzkar þjóðsögur og æfintýri). It is related to the theme of the calumniated wife and classified in the Aarne-Thompson-Uther Index as type ATU 707, "The Three Golden Children".

Source
According to Árnason, the tale was published from a manuscript by reverend Sveinbjörn Guðmundsson.

Translations
This tale has been variously translated as "The Story of The Farmer's Three Daughters", in Icelandic Legends (1866); as Die Bauerntöchter by Scandinavist  in Isländische Märchen (1884) and as Die neidischen Schwestern in Die neuisländischen Volksmärchen (1902), by Adeline Rittershaus.

Summary
A rich farmer lives with his three adult daughters. One day, they see the king riding along the path with the cobbler and the royal scribe. The three sisters announce their wishes: the elder sister wants to marry the king's cobbler, the middle one the king's scribe and the youngest the king himself. The king overhears their conversation and summons them next to his companions. The sisters repeat their wishes and the king consents in fulfilling their wishes.

The youngest sister marries the king, to the jealousy of her elder sisters.  When the new queen is ready to give birth to her first child (a son), the sisters offer to look after her, but they take the child as soon as they are born and abandon him on a dyke out of the city, while they place a puppy in his place. The child is found and taken by a poor man to be raised. The same happens to the queen's second child (a son) and third child (a daughter). After the third birth, the king, seeing that the queen gave birth to animals, orders her to be locked in a house with a lion inside to be devoured. However, the lion does not devour the queen, and she lives out her days locked in that house.

Meanwhile, the man who found the children named the two elder boys Vilhjámur and Sigurdur, while the sister remains nameless. Years later, after their adoptive father dies, an old man comes to their house and tells them that on a distant rock a bird is perched that knows the language of men, but to seek it is dangerous, for many have searched for it, and none returned. Despite the perceived danger, the three siblings decide to seek the bird to learn of their true parentage. The old man warns them that, should they seek it, they have to climb the rock and not look behind, otherwise they will turn to stone. Should anyone be courageous enough to catch the bird, below his perch there is a basin of water to revive the petrified people.

The elder brother, Vilhjámur, leaves with his siblings a dagger as a token of life, and says that if three drops of blood appear on the dagger, then something happened to him. He then departs to the mountain. After three days, they notice the bloodied knife and Sigurdur goes after him. The same fate befalls Sigurdur. Their sister leaves for the mountain and bravely climbs it, paying no heed to the voices around her until she gets the bird.

At last she captures the bird, which congratulates her for her bravery, and guides her to revive the stones around the mountain. She revives her brothers and they ask the bird about their origins: they are the king's children, their aunts wanted to kill them and their mother is still alive.

One of the revived stones is another king's son, who falls in love with his saviour, the nameless sister, and joins the siblings in rescuing their mother from the lion's house. They take her out of the house, bathe and dress her in new clothes, and the group goes to the king's palace to reveal the whole truth to the king. He learns of his children's survival, reinstates his wife as queen and punishes the sisters by casting them to the lions. The sister marries the second king's son, while her brothers Vilhjámur and Sigurdur marry princesses and succeed their father.

Analysis

Tale type
The tale is classified in the international Aarne-Thompson-Uther Index as type ATU 707, "The Three Golden Children".

The tale has been compared to the German tale The Three Little Birds, collected by the Brothers Grimm, and The Sisters Envious of Their Cadette, published by Antoine Galland in The One Thousand and One Nights.

In a late-19th century study, scholar W. A. Clouston listed this tale as the "Icelandic version" of The Sisters Envious of Their Cadette, from the compilation The Arabian Nights.

Motifs
E. Kahle noted that in this tale, as with the other variants, the queen's abandoned children seek a talking bird and a magical water that revives the petrified people at the end of the tale. In the same vein, Adeline Rittershaus stated that in more complete variants of the same story, the third and youngest sister promises to bear the king children of wondrous aspect; and after the children are cast in the water, they survive and seek three treasures.

Variants

Denmark
Danish author Evald Tang Kristensen published some Danish variants in his lifetime. In the first tale, collected from a Jens Povlsen, from Tværmose with the title Det springende Vand og det spillende Træ og den talende Fugl ("The leaping water and the playing tree and the talking bird"), a king gets lost in the woods and stays the night in a house in the woods where three sisters live. They each tell one another their marriage plans, the third saying she wants to marry the king. The king overhears their conversation, marries the third sister and she gives birth to two boys and a girl, in three consecutive years. In this tale, the two sisters replace the children for animals.

In a second tale by Kristensen, collected from the wife of a man named Niels Pedersen, in Vejlby, with the title Den talende fugl, det syngende træ og det guldgule springvand ("The Talking Bird, the Singing Tree and the Golden-Yellow Fountain"), a king goes to war and leaves his wife to the care of his mother, who replaces her three grandchildren for animals.

In a third tale by Kristensen, collected from teller Ane Nielsen, in Lisbjærg Terp, with the title Den lille prins med guldstjærne på brystet ("The little prince with the golden star on the chest"), three princely brothers go on a journey and tell each other last night's dreams, the third tells he dreamt that he married a princess and that they had a son with a golden star on the chest. His two brothers try to kill him, but spare his life, as long as he works as their servant. The trio reaches another kingdom, whose princess falls in love with the third brother. She marries him and gives birth to a boy with a golden star. The boy's uncles bribe the widwife to cast the boy in the water to die, but the child is saved. Years later, the boy becomes a youth, works for a witch and marries her daughter. When he goes to his grandfather's palace with his wife, a parrot at the entrance announces the presence of "the prince with the golden star on his chest". Kristensen published a fourth tale with the title Den talende Fugl og det syngende Trae og det springende Vand ("The Talking Bird, the Singing Tree and the Leaping Water").

The Danish language magazine Skattegraveren published a tale provided by Jens Madsen, in Höjet, with the title Det rindende træ den syngende fugl og det gule vand ("The Flowing Tree, the Singing Bird and the Golden Water"), wherein the siblings (two brothers and a sister) seek the three treasures to embellish their castle, per the suggestion of a beggar. Another edition published a second tale, with the title Det glimrende vandspring, det spillende træ og den talende fugl ("The glistening water fountain, the playing tree and the talking bird"), that follows the usual story: three sisters, abandonment of children, quest for three treasures.

According to Bengt Holbek's Interpretation of Fairy Tales, Denmark registers at least four other variants of type 707: Livsens Vand ("The Water of Life"); Den talende fugl og det syngende trae ("The Talking Bird and the Singing Tree"), and two homonymous tales with the title Den Talende Fugl ("The Talking Bird").

Sweden
Tale type 707 in known in Sweden as Tre systrar vill ha kungen ("Three sisters want to marry the king"). Finnish folklorist Oskar Hackman summarized some Finnish-Swedish variants in his publication Finlands svenska folkdiktning under the banner Den talande fågeln, det spelande trädet och den rinnande källan ("The Talking Bird, The Playing Tree and the Flowing Spring").

In a Finnish-Swedish tale sourced by Hackman from Vörå or Oravais, a king loses his way during a hunt, and takes shelter in a house that belong to three maidens. In the night, the king overhears their conversation: the elder wants to marry the king's baker to eat the best bread, the middle one the king's cook to eat the best food, and the youngest the king himself to have both the best bread and the best food. The king marries the youngest, to the jealousy of her elder sisters. In the following years, the queen gives birth to three children, two boys (in the first two years) and a girl (in the third year). Each time, the jealous sisters replace the babies for animals (respectively, a kitten, a puppy, and a rat) and throw them in the water, but they are saved by a gardener. Years later, the three siblings are exhorted by an old woman to seek the talking bird, the playing tree and the flowing spring. The two elder brothers fail and become stone, and the girl obtains the objects and rescues her brothers.

In another Finnish-Swedish tale, from Nyland, the King of England loses his way during a hunt and takes shelter in a hut where three sisters live. In the same night, the king overhears their talk: the elder wants to marry the baker, the middle one to the cook, and the youngest to the king himself. The king marries the sisters to their suitors of choice, to the jealousy of his sisters-in-law. The jealous sisters take the queen's children, their nephews and niece, cast them in the water, but the children are saved by a miller. In this tale, when he is seventeen years old, the queen's elder child, a boy, has a dream about "the promised land", and goes there. He becomes stone, as does his younger brother. Their sister goes to "the promised land", finds the talking bird in cage, the "levande vatten" (living water) and the "levande träd" (living tree).

In a tale from Nagu, an old man pays a visit to a house where three orphaned siblings live, and tells them about the three treasures in a distant land: the talking bird, the playing water and the living tree that always bear fruit. The siblings, two boys and a girl, decide to look for the treasures. The elder two fail and become stone, while the girl takes the items and rescues her brothers. She decorates their house with the objects. During a hunt, a king sees the objects and visits the siblings' house. The talking bird then reveals the king is the siblings' father, and they were taken by a troll years ago.

Swedish author  published a Swedish tale titled Historie om Talande fogeln, spelande trädet och rinnande wattukällan (or vatukällan). In this tale, after his father dies, the young prince of England becomes king. He enjoys hunting, and, during one, he loses his way in the forest while chasing a deer. Fortunately, he finds a house in the woods where he takes shelter with three orphaned sisters, who mistake him for a rich gentleman. While the young king rests, the three sisters talk among themselves: the elder one wants to marry the king's baker to eat the best bread; the middle one the king's cook to have the best food, and the youngest the king himself. The young king fulfills their wishes and he chooses the youngest maiden as his wife, while her elder sisters marry the baker and the cook. Fueled by jealousy towards their cadette, the elders sisters take the queen's children and cast them in the water. The children are saved by a gardener and raised by him. Years later, the elder siblings, two boys, like to hunt, while their sister spends her days at home. In one of such days, the sister welcomes an old woman as her guest. The old woman compliments their house, but tells her that it will be even more beautiful if she and her brothers have the talking bird, the playing tree and the flowing waterspring. After the old woman leaves, the brothers return home and are told of the three marvellous treasures they must seek. The two brothers begin the quest, but fail and are turned to stone, while their sister obtains the items and rescues them, along with other people in the mountain. The siblings bring the treasures back home. Some time later, the brothers meet the king during a hunt and invite him to their house for dinner. The bird advises them to prepare a dish with pearls. During dinner with the king, the bird tells them that the siblings are his children, born of the disgraced queen.

Other versions have been recorded from Swedish sources: Om i éin kung in England, from Sjundeå; and Det gyllene trädet, den sjungande floden och den talande fågeln ("The Golden Tree, the Singing River and the Talking Bird"), by folklore researcher Eva Wigström.

Adaptations
Angus W. Hall adapted the tale as The Three Peasant Maidens, published in Icelandic Fairy Tales. In his literary version, the three sisters are named Alitea, Truda and Hertha; the eldest, Alitea, wants to marry the king's valet and the middle one, Truda, the king's secretary; the king's name is Leofric; the children are given the names Wilhelm, Sigurd and Olga.

References 

Icelandic folklore
Icelandic fairy tales
Fictional kings
Fictional queens
Child abandonment
Adoption forms and related practices
Adoption, fostering, orphan care and displacement
Birds in culture
Fictional birds
ATU 700-749